Margin of safety may refer to:

Margin of safety (financial) in a financial context
Margin of safety (medicine) for pharmaceutical drugs
Margin of safety (accounting) in cost accounting
Margin of safety (engineering) in structural engineering
Margin of Safety (book), by Seth Klarman